The Stapleton Houses are a housing project in the Stapleton neighborhood of Staten Island, New York City. The project consists of six 8-story buildings with 693 apartment units. It is owned and managed by New York City Housing Authority (NYCHA) and is the largest NYCHA development in Staten Island.

Development 
The Stapleton Houses, which began construction in 1959, were designed by architects Ballard, Todd & Snibbe. Each building was designed to be long and narrow and with outdoor galleries to remove interior corridors. Facilities on the site include three playgrounds, lounge, meeting rooms, childcare center and a covered garden terrace. The development was completed on May 31, 1962. 

In the 1980s, the development saw the rise of the crack epidemic, and with that a rise in crime. Crime declined in the 1990s, but violence did not and the houses are now home to a large array of security cameras.

Notable residents 

 9th Prince, rapper of Killarmy
 Ghostface Killah (born 1970), rapper of the Wu-Tang Clan
 RZA (born 1969), rapper and leader of the Wu-Tang Clan
 Kenny Washington (born 1958), jazz drummer
 Mack Wilds (born 1989), R&B/Hip-Hop singer and actor
 Ronell Wilson (born 1982), convicted of the 2003 murder of two undercover New York City police officers

See also 
 List of New York City Housing Authority properties

References 

Public housing in Staten Island
Residential buildings in Staten Island
Residential buildings completed in 1960
1960 establishments in New York City